Patagosphenos is an extinct genus of sphenodontian from the Late Cretaceous Huincul Formation of Argentina. It contains a single species, Patagosphenos watuku.

References 

Cretaceous Argentina

Sphenodontia